Ranjeet Singh Pandre (born 4 January 1995), is an Indian professional footballer who plays as a forward for Kenkre in the I-League.

Career 
Ranjeet lanky striker, joined Union Bank of India (UBI) 2017–18 season. Ranjeet played an instrumental role in UBI's terrific season who also finished as the runner-up in the RCF Nadkarni Cup 2018, losing to Air India in the last minute. Ranjeet also went out to represent Maharashtra football team in the Santosh Trophy where he was their top-scorer. Ranjeet’s superb form and consistency earned him the best striker award for the MDFA Elite Division in the MDFA Awards Night 2018.

He made his professional debut for the Chennai City F.C. against Aizawl F.C. on 18 January 2019, He was brought in the 90th minute as Chennai City won 4–3.

Career statistics

Club

References

1995 births
Living people
People from Rajnandgaon
Indian footballers
Chennai City FC players  
Footballers from Chhattisgarh
I-League players
Association football defenders
Maharashtra football team players